Siyāsatnāmeh (Persian: سیاست نامه, "Book of Politics"), also known as Siyar al-mulûk (Arabic: سيرالملوك, i.e.: The Lives of Kings), is the most famous work by Nizam al-Mulk, the founder of Nizamiyyah schools in medieval Persia and vazier to the Seljuq sultans Alp Arslan and Malik Shah. Nizam al-Mulk possessed "immense power"  as the head administration for the Seljuq empire over a period of 30 years and was responsible for establishing distinctly Persian forms of Islamic government and administration which would last for centuries. A great deal of his approach to governing is contained within the Siyasatnameh which is in a tradition of Persian-Islamic writing known as the "Mirrors for Princes".

Written in Persian and composed in the eleventh century, the Siyasatnameh was created following the request by Malik Shah that his ministers produce books on government, administration and the troubles facing the nation. However, the treatise compiled by Nizam al-Mulk was the only one to receive approval and was consequently accepted as forming "the law of the constitution of the nation". In all it consists of 50 chapters concerning religion, politics, and various other issues of the day with the final 11 chapters - written shortly prior to Nizam's assassination - dealing mostly with dangers facing the empire and particularly the ascendant threat of the Ismailis. The treatise is concerned with guiding the ruler with regard to the realities of government and how it should be run. It covers "the proper role of soldiers, police, spies, and finance officials" and provides ethical advice emphasizing the need for justice and religious piety in the ruler. Nizam al-Mulk defines in detail what he views as justice; that all classes be "given their due" and that the weak be protected. Where possible justice is defined by both custom and Muslim law and the ruler is held responsible to God.

Anecdotes rooted in Islamic, and occasionally pre-Islamic Persian, culture and history with popular heroes - for example, Mahmud of Ghazna and the pre-Islamic Shah Khosrow Anushirvan - who were considered as exemplars of good and virtue frequently appearing. The Siyasatnameh is considered to provide insight into the attitude of the Persian elite of the 12th century towards the past of their civilization as well as evidence for methods of the bureaucracy and the extent it was influenced by the pre-Islamic traditions.

The earliest remaining copy is located in the National Library of Tabriz, in Iran. It was first translated into French in 1891.

See also
Persian literature
Mirrors for princes
Nasîhatnâme
Seyahatname
Sefâretnâme

Notes

External links
French translation of 1893, by Charles Schefer
English translation of 1960, by Hubert Darke
Islamic mirrors for princes
Medieval Persian literature
Seljuk Empire